Cameron Osteen, better known by his stage name Cam O'bi, is an American record producer, singer-songwriter and audio engineer. He has produced for Chance the Rapper, Vic Mensa, Mick Jenkins, Noname, J. Cole, Bas, Saba, and Isaiah Rashad. His upcoming debut album is titled Grown Ass Kid.

Musical career

2012–17: Career beginnings 
Osteen began his music career as part of J.U.S.T.I.C.E. League, a production team based in Tampa, Florida, but is best known for his solo production and songwriting work with Chicago artists Chance the Rapper, Vic Mensa, Mick Jenkins, Noname, and Saba. In 2015, he went on tour with J. Cole as a producer in the Forest Hills Drive Tour, where he began working more with Dreamville artists including Bas and Lute. Osteen was also part of the team working on Grammy Award winning Coloring Book (mixtape) in 2017, which was the first ever streaming only album to win a Grammy Award. In 2017 he was included in the XXL best Hip-Hop producers list.

2018–present: Solo career 
January 2018 saw the launch of Osteen as an artist in his own right, with single TenderHeaded which features Smino. The song received positive feedback from media music press. and has found its way on the BBC Radio 1 playlists in the UK. His debut album Grown Ass Kid has no release date, but is expected to be released in 2018. The album will feature the single Grown Ass Kid which was a co-production between Chance the Rapper and Cam Obi, and was initially intended for Grammy Award winning Coloring Book in 2017, however didn't make the final cut.

Discography

Studio albums
Grown Ass Kid (TBA)

Production discography

2013
Chance the Rapper – Acid Rap
01. "Good Ass Intro" (featuring BJ the Chicago Kid, Lili K., Kiara Lanier, Peter Cottontale, Will of the O'mys and JP of Kids These Days)
03. "Cocoa Butter Kisses" (featuring Vic Mensa and Twista)
13. "Everything's Good (Good Ass Outro)"

Vic Mensa – Innanetape
01. "Welcome to INNANET"
02. "Orange Soda"
09. "Hollywood LA" (featuring Lili K.)
10. "Holy Holy" (featuring Ab-Soul and BJ the Chicago Kid)

Lil Wayne – Dedication 5
07. "You Song" (featuring Chance the Rapper)

2014
Mick Jenkins – The Waters
05. "Comfortable" (featuring Noname)

2015
Rejjie Snow
00. "All Around the World”

EarthGang – Strays With Rabies
14. "Simba”

2016
Bas – Too High to Riot
01. "Too High to Riot"

Domo Genesis – Genesis
03. "Wanderer" (featuring Tay Walker)
08. "Faded in the Moment" (featuring Cam O'bi)

Twenty88 – Twenty88
01. "Déjà Vu"
03. "On the Way"

Towkio – .Wav Theory
04. "Free Your Mind" (featuring Donnie Trumpet)

Chance the Rapper – Coloring Book
13. "Blessings (Reprise)" (featuring Ty Dolla Sign, Raury, BJ the Chicago Kidand Anderson Paak)

Noname – Telefone
01. "Yesterday"
02. "Sunny Duet" (with theMIND)
03. "Diddy Bop" (featuring Raury and Cam O'bi)
05. "Reality Check" (featuring Eryn Allen Kane and Akenya)
09. "Bye Bye Baby"
10. "Shadow Man" (featuring Saba, Smino and Phoelix)

Saba – Bucket List Project
03. "GPS" (featuring Twista)
04. "Church (Liquor Store)" (featuring Noname)

Isaiah Rashad – The Sun's Tirade
03. "Free Lunch"

Mick Jenkins – The Healing Component
14. "Angles" (featuring Noname and Xavier Omar)

2017
J. Cole 
00. "High for Hours"

SZA – CTRL
03. "Doves in the Wind" (featuring Kendrick Lamar)

Lute – West1996 pt. 2
07. "Ford's Prayer" (featuring Cam O'bi)
09. "Premonition" (featuring EarthGang & Cam O'bi) Rejjie Snow- The Moon & You
Purple Tuesday (featuring Jesse Boykins lll & Joey Bada$$)

2018
Rejjie S- Dear Annie
05. "Pink Lemonade" (featuring Cam O'bi)
14. "The Rain" (featuring Krondon & Cam O'bi)

2019
Revenge of the Dreamers III17. "PTSD" (with Omen featuring Mereba, Deante' Hitchcock and St. Beauty)

Cam O’bi – Grown Ass Kid''
"Grown Ass Kid" (featuring Chance the Rapper, Mick Jenkins & Alex Wiley)
"Living Single" (featuring Big Sean, Chance The Rapper & Jeremih)
"TenderHead" (featuring Smino)

References

Singers from Chicago
Record producers from Illinois
Year of birth missing (living people)
Living people